Steve Gong (traditional Chinese: 鞏睿; born June 16, 1985) is a New York-based photojournalist whose work has exposed life in North Korea.  His film, Pyongyang Style, was broadcast around the world as undercover photojournalism of the country under Kim Jong-il.  The work comes after two American journalists were detained, until former US President Bill Clinton negotiated their release. He has also won acclaim for his work in Anhui, China winning the Audience Award and the Runner Up Award at the 2007 Salmagundi Film Festival, and for his photojournalistic travels in more than 58 countries 

Gong was born in Beijing, China, raised in Rome, Italy, studied at the University of Virginia and graduated with degrees in Biology and Psychology, and obtained an M.A. in Photojournalism and Documentary Photography at the London College of Communication at the University of the Arts London.

References

External links
Steve Gong photography
Pyongyang Style Video
Steve Gong in popular media

Chinese photojournalists
Living people
1985 births